KMBZ (980 kHz) is a commercial AM radio station licensed to Kansas City, Missouri. KMBZ is owned by Audacy, Inc. and it airs a talk radio format.  Its studios and transmitter tower are in suburban Mission, Kansas, at separate locations.

After a local morning drive time news show, simulcast with co-owned 98.1 KMBZ-FM, KMBZ's weekday schedule is made up of nationally syndicated talk programs including Dana Loesch, Glenn Beck, Sean Hannity, Tom Sullivan, Joe Pags, Joe Pags and Coast to Coast AM with George Noory.  World and national news is supplied at the beginning of each hour by ABC News Radio.  Weekend programming includes shows on money, health, computers and cooking, as well as paid brokered programming.  KMBZ's sister station, KMBZ-FM, airs mostly local talk shows.

KMBZ operates at 9,000 watts with a non-directional antenna by day; at night, however, it reduces power to 5,000 watts and uses a directional antenna to protect other stations on AM 980 from interference.  On January 14, 2015, KMBZ was granted an FCC construction permit to move to the KCCV transmitter site and increase the daytime power to 9,000 watts. Its signal covers the Kansas City metropolitan area, including parts of Missouri and Kansas.

History
KMBZ is the oldest surviving station in Kansas City, beginning experimental broadcasts in 1921.  The station officially signed on as a commercially licensed station on April 5, 1922, with the call sign WPE.  It was the second radio station in the state of Missouri, behind only St. Louis' WEW.

In its history, it has been owned by two rival branches of the Latter Day Saint movement, though it has no church affiliation now. The Reorganized Church of Jesus Christ of Latter Day Saints (RLDS Church) based in Independence, Missouri, bought the station in 1923 and renamed it KFIX and later KLDS (with the LDS standing for "Latter Day Saints").

In 1928, Midland Broadcasting bought the station and renamed it KMBC for Midland Broadcasting Company.  In 1953, Midland put KMBC-TV on the air as a shared time arrangement with another local radio station owner.  Cook Paint and Varnish Company bought the Midland holdings in 1954.  KMBC-AM-TV operated out of the Lyric Theatre.

In 1961, Cook sold the radio and television stations to Metromedia.  In 1962, Metromedia signed on KMBC-FM (later KMBR and KLTH, now KZPT). In 1967, Metromedia sold both radio stations to Bonneville International but kept the television station. Bonneville is owned by the Church of Jesus Christ of Latter-day Saints (LDS Church) based in Salt Lake City, marking the second time the station was owned by an LDS Church organization. Since Metromedia held the rights to the KMBC call letters, Bonneville changed the AM station's call letters to KMBZ. The choice was deliberate; "Z" rhymes with "C", allowing Bonneville to continue trading on the old call letters.  In the 1970s and early 1980s, the station's nickname was "Z-98". During those years, the station aired a full service middle of the road music format.

In 1997, Bonneville sold its entire Kansas City cluster, which by then consisted of KMBZ, KLTH, and KCMO-AM-FM, to Entercom Communications (now Audacy).

Paul Henning, who created The Beverly Hillbillies, was a writer, actor, disc jockey and newsreader at the station early in his career.

After having worked as Director of Promotion for the Kansas City Royals baseball team, Rush Limbaugh got his start in political commentary on the station in 1983. He continued to be heard on KMBZ, through his syndicated talk show, until his death in 2021.  For many years KMBZ also repeated Limbaugh's show overnight.

KMBZ was the Royals flagship station for some time. For a time in the 1980s, it ceded flagship status to WIBW in Topeka, Kansas. In 2008, Royals games switched to co-owned sports radio station KCSP.  Beginning in 2009, some Royals games returned to KMBZ, when KCSP is committed to another sporting event.  KMBZ is also the Kansas City affiliate for the Missouri Tigers radio network, broadcasting football, men's and women's basketball and the "Tiger Talk" coach's show.

In 2009, KMBZ began simulcasting its programming on the HD3 subchannel of sister station KUDL.  On March 24, 2011, Entercom announced that on March 30, KUDL's analog FM broadcasts would become a full-time simulcast of KMBZ as KMBZ-FM. On December 24, 2014, Entercom announced that the KMBZ simulcast would split on January 5, 2015; on that date, KMBZ became "Talk 980," carrying mostly syndicated shows, while KMBZ-FM began airing a mostly locally-oriented programming schedule.

Former hosts
 Charles Wheeler
 Jack Cashill

References

External links 

KMBZ Frequency History
History of KMBZ

MBZ
News and talk radio stations in the United States
Metromedia
Radio stations established in 1922
1922 establishments in Missouri
Audacy, Inc. radio stations
Radio stations licensed before 1923 and still broadcasting